Alfred Dompert (23 December 1914 – 11 August 1991) was a German runner who won a bronze medal in the 3000 m steeplechase at the 1936 Summer Olympics. He was the German champion in this event in 1937, 1947 and 1950. After retiring from competitions he worked as a sports administrator in Württemberg and was a youth trainer in the Skiing Association of Schwaben. In 1950 he became the first athlete to receive the Rudolf-Harbig-Gedächtnispreis, and in 1956 he was awarded the Golden Needle of the German Track and Field Association.

References

External links 
 

1914 births
1991 deaths
German male middle-distance runners
Olympic bronze medalists for Germany
Athletes (track and field) at the 1936 Summer Olympics
Olympic athletes of Germany
Sportspeople from Stuttgart
German male steeplechase runners
Medalists at the 1936 Summer Olympics
Olympic bronze medalists in athletics (track and field)
20th-century German people